Future Generali India Insurance (FGII) Company Limited is a private general insurance company in India. The company is a joint venture between the Future Group and Generali Participations Netherlands N.V. The company’s portfolio comprises insurance products categorised within Personal, Commercial and Social/Rural Insurance.

As of 2022, the company has over 3000 active corporate clients and more than 21,500 agents.

History 
Future Generali India Insurance (FGII) was established in 2006 with the aim of providing retail, commercial, personal, and rural insurance services to both individuals and corporations to help them manage and mitigate risks. In 2013, the company received ISO 9001:2008 certification, followed by ISO 27001:2013 certification in 2014.

FGII has partenered with banks like Bank of Maharashtra, UCO Bank and Bank of India etc to promote motor, home, health, and rural insurance products. 

In May 2022, Generali completed the acquisition from Future Enterprises of approximately 25 per cent stake in Future Generali India Insurance, and its stake in the JV has now gone up to 74 per cent.

The company has a self-service app, FG Insure, which allows customers to manage their policies, purchase and renew insurance, report claims, and track their status. In 2016, FGII launched i-MoSS, an application for motor claim surveyors for faster settlement of motor claims.

Key people  
 Anup Rau, Managing Director & CEO
 Devi Dayal Garg, Chief Financial Officer
 Deepak Prasad, Chief Operating Officer
 Ruchika Varma, Chief Marketing Officer
 Ashish Lakhtakia, Chief Legal & Compliance Officer and Company Secretary 
 M. Raghavendra Rao, Chief Distribution Officer  
 Jatin Arora, Appointed Actuary 
 Ajay Panchal, Chief Risk Officer  
 Milan P. Shirodkar, Chief of Investments 
 Ritu Sethi, Chief Internal Audit Officer 
 Sunil Wariar, Chief People Officer

Products 
The company provides a diverse range of insurance, including personal, commercial and social/rural insurance. 

In March 2022, it launched health insurance for pet dogs called FG Dog Health Cover, which comes with coverage, including death and funeral, terminal illness, surgery and treatment and pre-hospitalization and post-hospitalization expenses.

In September 2022, the company launched FG Health Absolute, a health insurance product that gives customers access to value-added services like tele counseling, webinars on mental and physical health, vouchers for wellness centers, fitness, sports and diagnostic centers and regular health check-ups.

Financials
Future Generali India Insurance reported its Gross Written Premium of ₹4,210.35 crore in the financial year 2021–22, while in FY 2020-21, it was ₹3,898.91 crore, a growth of 8%. The company reported a solvency ratio of 166% in FY 2021–22. The Net Promoter Score (NPS), of the company stood at 59.4 in FY 2021-2022.

Shareholding

CSR initiatives 
In 2018, Future Generali India Insurance adopted The Human Safety Net (THSN), a global CSR initiative which targets key social issues affecting communities. The company has collaborated with United Way Mumbai to support children from disadvantaged communities. Future Generali India Insurance donated 8,500 masks to the BMC, with message on mental health awareness.

Awards and recognition 
Future Generali India Insurance has received several awards in recognition of its efforts in various fields. In 2022, the company received the Golden Peacock Award for Excellence in Corporate Governance. In 2021, it was awarded the BFSI Silver Medal at the ET Brand Disruption Awards by The Economic Times. The company was also named the Brand of the Year, receiving 3 Gold, 2 Silver, and 2 Bronze awards at the e4m Health Marcom Awards 2022. It also won a silver award at the ETBrandEquity Shark Awards 2022. For its 2022 annual report, the company received platinum award at Marcom Awards 2022 and gold award at the 2022 Spotlight Awards Global Communications Competition by LACP.

References

External links
 

  

Financial services companies established in 2007
Insurance companies of India
Financial services companies based in Mumbai
2007 establishments in Maharashtra